Revelstoke was a provincial electoral district in the Canadian province of British Columbia.  It made its first appearance on the hustings in the election of 1903 and lasted until the 1928 election, 

In 1966 Revelstoke was merged with Kaslo-Slocan to form Revelstoke-Slocan, and in 1979 was merged with Shuswap to form Shuswap-Revelstoke. Since 1991 Revelstoke has been part of Columbia River-Revelstoke.

For other current and historical electoral districts in the Kootenay region, please see Kootenay (electoral districts).

Electoral history 
Note:  Winners of each election are in bold.

|Liberal
|James M. Kellie
|align="right"|316 	
|align="right"|37.44%
|align="right"|
|align="right"|unknown

|- bgcolor="white"
!align="right" colspan=3|Total valid votes
!align="right"|844  	
!align="right"|100.00%
!align="right"|
|- bgcolor="white"
!align="right" colspan=3|Total rejected ballots
!align="right"|
!align="right"|
!align="right"|
|- bgcolor="white"
!align="right" colspan=3|Turnout
!align="right"|%
!align="right"|
!align="right"|
|}

|Liberal
|Robert Caley
|align="right"|269 	 		
|align="right"|33.50%
|align="right"|
|align="right"|unknown

|- bgcolor="white"
!align="right" colspan=3|Total valid votes
!align="right"|803
!align="right"|100.00%
!align="right"|
|- bgcolor="white"
!align="right" colspan=3|Total rejected ballots
!align="right"|
!align="right"|
!align="right"|
|- bgcolor="white"
!align="right" colspan=3|Turnout
!align="right"|%
!align="right"|
!align="right"|
|}	

|Independent 1
|Robert Caley
|align="right"|340 	 	 		
|align="right"|27.89%
|align="right"|
|align="right"|unknown

|- bgcolor="white"
!align="right" colspan=3|Total valid votes
!align="right"|1,219 	
!align="right"|100.00%
!align="right"|
|- bgcolor="white"
!align="right" colspan=3|Total rejected ballots
!align="right"|
!align="right"|
!align="right"|
|- bgcolor="white"
!align="right" colspan=3|Turnout
!align="right"|%
!align="right"|
!align="right"|
|- bgcolor="white"
!align="right" colspan=7|1  Endorsed by Liberals.
|}

|- bgcolor="white"
!align="right" colspan=3|Total valid votes
!align="right"|n/a 	
!align="right"| -.- %
!align="right"|
|- bgcolor="white"
!align="right" colspan=3|Total rejected ballots
!align="right"|
!align="right"|
!align="right"|
|- bgcolor="white"
!align="right" colspan=3|Turnout
!align="right"|%
!align="right"|
!align="right"|
|}	

 
|Liberal
|William Henry Sutherland
|align="right"|802
|align="right"|60.62%
|align="right"|
|align="right"|unknown

|- bgcolor="white"
!align="right" colspan=3|Total valid votes
!align="right"|1,323  	
!align="right"|100.00%
!align="right"|
|- bgcolor="white"
!align="right" colspan=3|Total rejected ballots
!align="right"|
!align="right"|
!align="right"|
|- bgcolor="white"
!align="right" colspan=3|Turnout
!align="right"|%
!align="right"|
!align="right"|
|- bgcolor="white"
|}
  	  	  	  	 

 
|Liberal
|William Henry Sutherland
|align="right"|Accl.
|align="right"| -.- %
|align="right"|
|align="right"|unknown
|- bgcolor="white"
!align="right" colspan=3|Total valid votes
!align="right"|n/a 	
!align="right"| -.- %
!align="right"|
|- bgcolor="white"
!align="right" colspan=3|Total rejected ballots
!align="right"|
!align="right"|
!align="right"|
|- bgcolor="white"
!align="right" colspan=3|Turnout
!align="right"|%
!align="right"|
!align="right"|
|}
  	  	  	  	 

 
|Liberal
|William Henry Sutherland
|align="right"|1,099
|align="right"|59.05%
|align="right"|
|align="right"|unknown
|- bgcolor="white"
!align="right" colspan=3|Total valid votes
!align="right"|1,861  	
!align="right"|100.00%
!align="right"|
|- bgcolor="white"
!align="right" colspan=3|Total rejected ballots
!align="right"|
!align="right"|
!align="right"|
|- bgcolor="white"
!align="right" colspan=3|Turnout
!align="right"|%
!align="right"|
!align="right"|
|}  	 
  	  	  	 

 
|Liberal
|William Henry Sutherland
|align="right"|1,170
|align="right"|56.36%
|align="right"|
|align="right"|unknown
|- bgcolor="white"
!align="right" colspan=3|Total valid votes
!align="right"|2,076 	
!align="right"|100.00%
!align="right"|
|- bgcolor="white"
!align="right" colspan=3|Total rejected ballots
!align="right"|52
!align="right"|
!align="right"|
|- bgcolor="white"
!align="right" colspan=3|Turnout
!align="right"|%
!align="right"|
!align="right"|
|}

After the 1928 election there was a redistribution.  The Revelstoke riding was merged with the Columbia riding to form Columbia-Revelstoke, which appeared in the 1933 general election.  In the following election, they were separate ridings again.  For results, see Columbia-Revelstoke.

 
|Liberal
|Harry Johnston
|align="right"|1,162
|align="right"|61.2%
|align="right"|
|align="right"|unknown

 
|Co-operative Commonwealth Fed.
|Almen
|align="right"|205 	 		
|align="right"|10.8%
|align="right"|
|align="right"|unknown
|- bgcolor="white"
!align="right" colspan=3|Total valid votes
!align="right"|1900
!align="right"|100.00%
!align="right"|
|- bgcolor="white"
!align="right" colspan=3|Total rejected ballots
!align="right"|73
!align="right"|
!align="right"|
|- bgcolor="white"
!align="right" colspan=3|Turnout
!align="right"|86.7%
!align="right"|
!align="right"|
|}

 
|Liberal
|Harry Johnston
|align="right"|1065
|align="right"|49.1%
|align="right"|
|align="right"|unknown
 
|Co-operative Commonwealth Fed.
|McKenzie
|align="right"|678
|align="right"|31.2%
|align="right"|
|align="right"|unknown

|- bgcolor="white"
!align="right" colspan=3|Total valid votes
!align="right"|2170
!align="right"|100.00%
!align="right"|
|- bgcolor="white"
!align="right" colspan=3|Total rejected ballots
!align="right"|27
!align="right"|
!align="right"|
|- bgcolor="white"
!align="right" colspan=3|Turnout
!align="right"|77.6%
!align="right"|
!align="right"|
|}

 
|Co-operative Commonwealth Fed.
|Vincent Segur
|align="right"|1039
|align="right"|48.8%
|align="right"|
|align="right"|unknown
|- bgcolor="white"
!align="right" colspan=3|Total valid votes
!align="right"|2128
!align="right"|100.00%
!align="right"|
|- bgcolor="white"
!align="right" colspan=3|Total rejected ballots
!align="right"|22
!align="right"|
!align="right"|
|- bgcolor="white"
!align="right" colspan=3|Turnout
!align="right"|74.9%
!align="right"|
!align="right"|
|}

 
|Co-operative Commonwealth Fed.
|Vincent Segur
|align="right"|1262
|align="right"|49.0%
|align="right"|
|align="right"|unknown
|- bgcolor="white"
!align="right" colspan=3|Total valid votes
!align="right"|2573
!align="right"|100.00%
!align="right"|
|- bgcolor="white"
!align="right" colspan=3|Total rejected ballots
!align="right"|70
!align="right"|
!align="right"|
|- bgcolor="white"
!align="right" colspan=3|Turnout
!align="right"|83.5%
!align="right"|
!align="right"|
|}

|-

|Co-operative Commonwealth Fed.
|Vincent Segur
|align="right"|942
|align="right"|34.5%
|align="right"|1320
|align="right"|56.5%
|align="right"|
|align="right"|unknown

|Liberal
|Rutherford
|align="right"|636
|align="right"|23.3%
|align="right"|1015 
|align="right"|43.5%
|align="right"|
|align="right"|unknown

|- bgcolor="white"
!align="right" colspan=3|Total valid votes
!align="right"|2731              
!align="right"|100.00%
!align="right"|2335 
!align="right"|%
!align="right"|
|- bgcolor="white"
!align="right" colspan=3|Total rejected ballots
!align="right"|153
!align="right"|
!align="right"|
|- bgcolor="white"
!align="right" colspan=3|Turnout
!align="right"|79.1%
!align="right"|
!align="right"|
|- bgcolor="white"
!align="right" colspan=9|1 Preferential ballot; final count is between top two candidates from first count; intermediary counts (of 4) not shown.
|}

|-

|Co-operative Commonwealth Fed.
|Vincent Segur
|align="right"|1009
|align="right"|37.1%
|align="right"|1284
|align="right"|55.9%
|align="right"|
|align="right"|unknown

|Liberal
|Stoodley
|align="right"|551
|align="right"|20.2%
|align="right"|1012 
|align="right"|44.1%
|align="right"|
|align="right"|unknown

}
|Independent
|Arvid Lundell
|align="right"|522 
|align="right"|19.2%
|align="right"| -   
|align="right"| -.- %
|align="right"|
|align="right"|unknown
|- bgcolor="white"
!align="right" colspan=3|Total valid votes
!align="right"|2721              
!align="right"|100.00%
!align="right"|2296 
!align="right"|%
!align="right"|
|- bgcolor="white"
!align="right" colspan=3|Total rejected ballots
!align="right"|116
!align="right"|
!align="right"|
|- bgcolor="white"
!align="right" colspan=3|Turnout
!align="right"|79.4%
!align="right"|
!align="right"|
|- bgcolor="white"
!align="right" colspan=9|2 Preferential ballot; final count is between top two candidates from first count; intermediary counts (of 4) not shown.
|}

 
|Co-operative Commonwealth Fed.
|George Hobbs
|align="right"|985
|align="right"|36.6%
|align="right"|
|align="right"|unknown
 
|Liberal
|Delacherois
|align="right"|364
|align="right"|13.5%
|align="right"|
|align="right"|unknown
|- bgcolor="white"
!align="right" colspan=3|Total valid votes
!align="right"|2688
!align="right"|%
!align="right"|
|- bgcolor="white"
!align="right" colspan=3|Total rejected ballots
!align="right"|30
!align="right"|
!align="right"|
|- bgcolor="white"
!align="right" colspan=3|Turnout
!align="right"|68.5%
!align="right"|
!align="right"|
|}

 
|Co-operative Commonwealth Fed.
|George Hobbs
|align="right"|985
|align="right"|36.6%
|align="right"|
|align="right"|unknown
 
|Liberal
|Delacherois
|align="right"|364
|align="right"|13.5%
|align="right"|
|align="right"|unknown
|- bgcolor="white"
!align="right" colspan=3|Total valid votes
!align="right"|2688
!align="right"|%
!align="right"|
|- bgcolor="white"
!align="right" colspan=3|Total rejected ballots
!align="right"|30
!align="right"|
!align="right"|
|- bgcolor="white"
!align="right" colspan=3|Turnout
!align="right"|68.5%
!align="right"|
!align="right"|
|}

 
|Co-operative Commonwealth Fed.
|George Hobbs
|align="right"|1417
|align="right"|44.1%
|align="right"|
|align="right"|unknown

 
|Liberal
|Hardman
|align="right"|585
|align="right"|18.2%
|align="right"|
|align="right"|unknown

|- bgcolor="white"
!align="right" colspan=3|Total valid votes
!align="right"|3212
!align="right"|%
!align="right"|
|- bgcolor="white"
!align="right" colspan=3|Total rejected ballots
!align="right"|30
!align="right"|
!align="right"|
|- bgcolor="white"
!align="right" colspan=3|Turnout
!align="right"|79.0%
!align="right"|
!align="right"|
|}

For successive election results see Revelstoke-Slocan.

Sources 

Elections BC Historical Returns

Former provincial electoral districts of British Columbia